PixelJunk SideScroller is a  side-scrolling shoot 'em up game developed by Q-Games for the PlayStation 3 as part of the PixelJunk series. Visually, it is designed to resemble old vector-based games and is based on the "Road to Dawn" bonus stage in PixelJunk Shooter 2.

Reception

PixelJunk SideScroller received "generally favourable reviews" according to the review aggregation website Metacritic.

References

External links
 PixelJunk SideScroller's Official website
 

2011 video games
PlayStation 3 games
PlayStation 3-only games
PlayStation Network games
Horizontally scrolling shooters
Sony Interactive Entertainment games
Video games developed in Japan
Q-Games games